Anthonie Willem Constantijn Gneomar "Antonie" Kamerling (25 August 1966 – 6 October 2010) was a Dutch actor and singer. He was member of the original cast of the Dutch soap opera Goede tijden, slechte tijden. He played in the films The Little Blonde Death (1993), All Stars (1997), and I Love You Too (2001). He also had starring roles in Dutch musical productions. He has become the voice of Geoff from Total Drama in the Dutch version of the series. Antonie Kamerling committed suicide in 2010.

Early life
Anthonie Willem Constantijn Gneomar Kamerling was born on 25 August 1966 in Arnhem in the Netherlands.

Career
Kamerling was still a law student when in 1990 he was cast in the then new Dutch soap opera Goede tijden, slechte tijden. His character, Peter Kelder, quickly became one of the most popular on the program.

In 1993, he got the lead in The Little Blonde Death, directed by Jean van de Velde. At the time, his casting was quite controversial, as soap actors were considered to be inferior to 'professional' actors. Kamerling eventually got nominated for a Gouden Kalf for best actor, the most important Dutch film award.

In 1997, he starred in another film by Van de Velde, All Stars. For the film, about an amateur football team, he sang the theme song, "Toen ik je zag" (When I Saw You), written by the popular Dutch singer Guus Meeuwis. The song was released as a single under his character's name, Hero, and soon was a number one hit on the Dutch charts. From that moment on, he tried to get a music career, but could never repeat the success of his first single.

After that point, Kamerling played in a couple more films, the most successful being I Love You Too (2001), and in television series like All Stars – De Serie and Onderweg naar Morgen. Later in his career, he played in a couple of musicals, including starring roles in the musical versions of Turkish Delight and Sunset Boulevard.

Personal life
Antonie Kamerling was married to actress Isa Hoes. They met on the set of Goede tijden, slechte tijden. They had two children together, son Merlijn and daughter Vlinder. His sister, Liesbeth is also an actress. Kamerling was a distant relative of the Ghanaian-born British actor Hugh Quarshie.

Kamerling was praised for his charity work with development organization Edukans, helping their efforts to provide basic education to underprivileged children in developing countries.

Death
Kamerling ended his life on 6 October 2010. Kamerling was buried at Zorgvlied on Tuesday 12 October 2010. He was 44 years old.

Filmography

References

External links

1966 births
2010 deaths
2010 suicides
Dutch male actors
Dutch male film actors
Dutch male singers
Dutch male television actors
People from Arnhem
Dutch male soap opera actors